Upendra Bahadur Angdembe who is known as Upendra Subba is a Nepali poet, lyricist and writer. He is one of the initiators of the movement called Srijanshil Arajakta (Creative Anarchy) along with Rajan Mukarung and Hangyug Agyat.

Early life 

Subba was born in Angsarang-8, Panchthar, an eastern hilly district. His birth name was Upendra Bahadur Angdembe.

In 1997, he moved to Kathmandu city from Damak to become a songwriter. His songwriting had started to see success with music composed by Shantiram Rai. His songs were sung by Deep Shrestha, Robin Sharma, Ananda Karki, Yam Baral and won some competitions. He became convinced that song recording was expensive and that the music industry was heading towards the directions unlike his taste.

Literary career 
Around this time, he met Rajan Mukarung and Hangyug Agyat. They jointly started a literary movement called Srijanshil Arajakta (meaning creative anarchy).

He credits their joint movement for his success in writing. He claimed that the success of Lato Pahad was because Rajan Mukarung paved path for him by success of his novels Hechhakuppa and winning Madan Puraskar with Damini Bhir.

He visited Hong Kong in 2016 to attend a program by Critics Society. He has visited Malaysia and Singapore in literary programs.

Flim career 
For his film writing, he gives credit to director Ram Babu Gurung. They have collaborated hit movies, including Kabaddi, Kabaddi Kabaddi. His first story was  Keba Kokma (Lato Pahad), in Limbu language, directed by Ravi Serma.

Lato Pahad was adapted as a theatrical play.

He made brief appearances in Kabaddi and Kabaddi Kabaddi, but deems those appearances as forced upon him by his friends.

Published works

Poetry Collection 
Dada mathi ko Gham jun ra Gadtirka Raake Bhut haru (2002) 
 Hongrayo Bhog ra Pangra (2004) 
 Kholako gita ra purana kavitaharu (2013)
 Desh Khojdai Jaada (2017)

Short stories collection 

 Lato Pahad (2014) (compilation of stories) adapted as movie Keba Kokma

Screenwriting 

Kabaddi (2013) script
 Kabaddi Kabaddi (2015) script
 Taandro (2015) script
 Purano Dunga (2016)

Music Album 

 Jiwan Akhir Ke Nai Ho Ra (2006) (Music Album)

Awards
 Nepali Pratibha Award by Nepali Pratibha Pratisthan, UK, 2010
 Padmashree Sahitya Puraskar in 2015 Lato Pahad 2015
 National award for best script writer for movie Kabaddi in 2015

References

External links

Lato-pahad-by-writer-upendra-subba
Goodreads Profile
Sahityasangraha
Taandro
Morning Khabar
OnlineKhabar
Critics' Society

1971 births
Living people
Nepali-language writers
Nepalese male poets
People from Panchthar District
21st-century Nepalese poets
21st-century Nepalese screenwriters
Nepalese screenwriters
20th-century Nepalese male writers
Limbu people